The cardiac nerves are autonomic nerves which supply the heart. They include:
 Superior cardiac nerve (nervus cardiacus cervicalis superior)
 Middle cardiac nerve (nervus cardiacus cervicalis medius)
 Inferior cardiac nerve (nervus cardiacus inferior)

Anatomy
The nerves go down to the root of the neck with these following association:

Posterior: "prevertebral fascia overlying anterolateral surface of vertebral bodies"

Superior: "common carotid artery"

Inferior: "subclavian artery"

Laterally: "sympathetic trunk"

References

Cardiology